The 2018 Alabama Crimson Tide baseball team represented the University of Alabama in the 2018 NCAA Division I baseball season. The Crimson Tide played their home games in the newly renovated Sewell–Thomas Stadium. This season was the first under head coach Brad Bohannon, following the firing of Greg Goff after one season.

Personnel

Returning starters

Roster

Coaching staff

Schedule

! style="" | Regular Season
|- valign="top" 

|- bgcolor="#ddffdd"
| February 16 ||  ||  || Tuscaloosa, AL || 16–2 || Finnerty (1–0) ||  Tieman (0–1) || None || 3,194|| 1–0||–
|- bgcolor="#ddffdd"
| February 17 || Valparaiso ||  || Sewell–Thomas Stadium || 6–5 || Duarte (1–0) || VanLanen (0–1) || None || 3,607 || 2–0||– 
|- bgcolor="#ddffdd"
| February 18 || Valparaiso  ||  || Sewell–Thomas Stadium || 12–6 || Vainer (1–0) || Gordon (0–1) || Guffey (1) || 2,867 || 3–0 ||– 
|- bgcolor="#ddffdd"
| February 20 ||  || || Sewell–Thomas Stadium ||4–0 || Adams (1–0) || Lester (0–1) || None || 2,902|| 4–0||– 
|- bgcolor="#ddffdd"
| February 23 (1) || || || Sewell–Thomas Stadium ||12–4 || Finnerty (2–0) || Mullins (0–2) || None || 3,882 || 5–0 ||–
|- bgcolor="#ddffdd"
|  || Washington State || || Sewell–Thomas Stadium || 8–2 || Walters (1–0) || Anderson (0–2) || Medders (1) || 3,882 || 6–0||–
|- bgcolor="#ddffdd"
| February 24 || Washington State ||  || Sewell–Thomas Stadium || 9–3 || Guffey (1–0) || Sunitsch (0–1) || None || 3,204 || 7–0||–
|- bgcolor="#ddffdd"
| February 27 || at  ||  || Griffin StadiumBirmingham, AL || 13–3 || Rukes (1–0) || Widra (0–1) || None || 1,344 || 8–0 || –
|- bgcolor="#ddffdd"
| February 28 ||  || No. 30 || Sewell–Thomas Stadium || 11–1 || Duke (1–0) || Vazquez (0–1) || None || 2,795|| 9–0||–
|-

|- bgcolor="#ffdddd"
| March 2|| at  ||  || Mitchell ParkNorman, OK || 1–211|| Hansen (1–1) ||  || None || 1,380 || 9–1 ||–
|- bgcolor="#ffdddd"
| March 3 || at Oklahoma || No. 30 ||Mitchell Park||4–16 || Grove (1–0) || Walters (1–1) || None || 1,775 || 9–2||–
|- bgcolor="#ddffdd"
| March 4 || at Oklahoma || No. 30 ||Mitchell Park || 13–1 || Gardner (1–0) || Tyler (0–2) || None ||779 || 10–2||–
|- bgcolor="#ddffdd"
| March 7 ||  || ||  || 3–0 || Love (1–0) || Powell (0–1) || Duarte (1) || 3,279 || 11–2 || –
|- bgcolor="#ffdddd"
| March 9 (1) ||  || ||Sewell–Thomas Stadium || 0–3 || Dehn (2–1) || Finnerty (2–1) ||  || 3,109  || 11–3||–
|- bgcolor="#ddffdd"
| March 9 (2) || New Mexico State || ||Sewell–Thomas Stadium || 3–1 || Walters (2–1) || Bradish (2–1) || Medders (2) || 3,109 || 12–3||–
|- bgcolor="#ddffdd"
| March 10 || New Mexico State || ||Sewell–Thomas Stadium || 5–2 || Vainer (2–0) || Groff (2–1)|| Duarte (2) ||2,530 || 13–3||–
|- bgcolor="#ddffdd"
| March 13 ||  || ||Sewell–Thomas Stadium ||15–07 || Duke (2–0) ||  Warner (0–1) || None|| 2,712|| 14–3||–
|- bgcolor="#ddffdd"
| March 14 || Alabama A&M|| ||Sewell–Thomas Stadium|| 14–07 ||Greene (1–0)|| Milam (0–5)||None||2,623|| 15–3||–
|- bgcolor="#ddffdd"
| March 16 ||  || || Sewell–Thomas Stadium ||  || Duarte (2–0) || Kristofak (1–1)|| None || 2,935 || 16–3 ||1–0
|- bgcolor="#ffdddd"
| March 17 || Georgia  || ||Sewell–Thomas Stadium ||5–6 || Hancock (2–1) || Walters (2–2) || Proctor (2) || 3,392|| 16–4||1–1
|- bgcolor="#ffdddd"
| March 18 || Georgia || ||Sewell–Thomas Stadium ||5–6 || Locey (3–0) || Vainer (2–1) || Kristofak (2) ||3,265 || 16–5||1–2
|- bgcolor="#ffdddd"
| March 20 || at  || || Regions FieldBirmingham, AL || 4–6 || Calvert (1–0) || Gardner (1–1) || Jones (1) || 1,757 || 16–6||–
|- bgcolor="#ffdddd"
| March 23 || at Tennessee|| || Lindsey Nelson StadiumKnoxville, TN || 4–5 ||  || Medders (0–1) || None || 1,874 || 16–7 || 1–3
|- bgcolor="#bbbbbb"
| March 24 || at Tennessee|| || Lindsey Nelson Stadium || colspan=7| Postponed (inclement weather) Makeup: March 25 as a single-admission, 7-inning doubleheader
|- bgcolor="#ffdddd"
| March 25 (1) || at Tennessee || ||Lindsey Nelson Stadium|| 1–27 || Stallings (4–1) || Walters (2–3) || None || – || 16–8||1–4
|- bgcolor="#ffdddd"
|  || at Tennessee || ||Lindsey Nelson Stadium || 0–37 || Neely (3–1) || Rukes (1–1) || None ||2,299 || 16–9||1–5
|- bgcolor="#ffdddd"
| March 27 † || vs. No. 16  || || Riverwalk StadiumMontgomery, AL ||2–5 || Owen (1–1) || Duke (2–1) || Coker (5) ||7,719 || 16–10 ||–
|- bgcolor="#ddffdd"
| March 30 || No. 15 Kentucky || || Sewell–Thomas Stadium|| 4–2 || Finnerty (3–1) || Hjelle (4–2) || Medders (3) || 4,421|| 17–10||2–5
|- bgcolor="#ddffdd"
| March 31 || No. 15 Kentucky || ||Sewell–Thomas Stadium|| 4–2 || Duarte (3–0) || Haake (1–1) || Medders (4) || 4,403|| 18–10||3–5
|-

|- bgcolor="#ffdddd"
|April 1 || No. 15 Kentucky || ||  || 2–5 || Lewis (5–2) || Guffey (1–1)  ||  || 3,399 || 18–11 ||3–6
|- bgcolor="#ffdddd"
|April 3 || || || Sewell–Thomas Stadium || 0–4 || Chandler (2–0) || Gardner (3–1)  || Simpson (5) || 3,119 || 18–12||–
|- bgcolor="#ddffdd"
|April 6 ||at No. 23 || ||Taylor StadiumColumbia, MO || 2–1 || Finnerty (4–1) || Sikkema (2–2) || Medders (5) || 406|| 19–12||4–6
|- bgcolor="#ffdddd"
|April 7 (1) || at No. 23 Missouri || ||Taylor Stadium|| 0–1 ||  || Duarte (3–1) || None || 541 || 19–13||4–7
|- bgcolor="#ddffdd"
|April 7 (2) ||at No. 23 Missouri || ||Taylor Stadium||5–1 || Cameron (2–1) || Montes (4–2) || Medders (6) || 541|| 20–13||5–7
|- bgcolor="#ddffdd"
|April 10 || UAB || ||Sewell–Thomas Stadium|| 12–3 || Adams (2–0) || Ruggles (0–2) || None || 3,724|| 21–13||– 
|- bgcolor="#ffdddd"
|April 12 |||| ||Olsen FieldCollege Station, TX || 6–12 || Sherrod (3–1) || Duarte (3–2) || Hoffman (6) || 4,607 || 21–14 || 5–8
|- bgcolor="#ffdddd"
|April 13 ||at No. 22 Texas A&M|| ||Olsen Field || 6–9 || Kilkenny (8–0) || Walters (2–4) || Lacy (1) || 6,094 || 21–15 || 5–9
|- bgcolor="#ffdddd"
|April 14 ||at No. 22 Texas A&M|| ||Olsen Field || 2–311 || Hoffman (4–1) || Medders (0–2) || None || 6,901 || 21–16 || 5–10
|- bgcolor="#ffdddd"
|April 17 || Samford|| ||Sewell–Thomas Stadium || 0–6 || Skinner (4–1) || Duke (2–2) || None || 3,008 || 21–17 ||–
|- bgcolor="#ddffdd"
|April 18 || ||  ||Sewell–Thomas Stadium || 3–0 || Adams (3–0) ||  || Stutts (1) || 2,741 || 22–17 || –
|- bgcolor="#ffdddd"
|April 20 || Auburn || ||Sewell–Thomas Stadium || 5–19 || Mize (8–1) || Finnerty (4–2) || None || 5,593 || 22–18 || 5–11
|- bgcolor="#ffdddd"
|April 21 (1) || Auburn || ||Sewell–Thomas Stadium|| 0–5 || Burns (3–4) || Walters (2–5) || None || 6,051 || 22–19 || 5–12
|- bgcolor="#ffdddd"
| || Auburn || ||Sewell–Thomas Stadium|| 5–20 || Davis (3–3) || Rukes (1–2) || None || 6,051 || 22–20 || 5–13
|- bgcolor="#ddffdd"
|April 24 || || ||Sewell–Thomas Stadium || 4–3 || Love (2–0) || Goodwin (3–3) || Cameron (1) || 3,308 || 23–20 || –
|- bgcolor="#ffdddd"
|April 27 ||at No. 10 Arkansas ||  || Baum StadiumFayetteville, AR || 3–7 || Knight (7–0) || Finnerty (4–3) || Reindl (3) || 10,835 || 23–21 || 5–14
|- bgcolor="#ffdddd"
|April 28 ||at No. 10 Arkansas || ||Baum Stadium|| 4–7 || Lee (4–2) || Guffey (1–2) || Loseke (2) || 10,846 || 23–22 || 5–15
|- bgcolor="#ffdddd"
|April 29 ||at No. 10 Arkansas || ||Baum Stadium|| 7–9 || Loseke (1–1) || Duarte (3–3) || Reindl (4) || 9,265 || 23–23 || 5–16
|-

|- bgcolor="#ffdddd"
|May 4 ||Mississippi State || ||   ||  || Neff (3–2) || Medders (0–3) || None || 3,411 || 23–24 || 5–17
|- bgcolor="#ddffdd"
|May 5 ||Mississippi State || ||Sewell–Thomas Stadium || 4–310 || Gardner (2–2) || Gordon (3–3) || None || 4,631 || 24–24 || 6–17
|- bgcolor="#ffdddd"
| May 6 ||Mississippi State || ||Sewell–Thomas Stadium  || 4–6 || France (3–2) || Cameron (1–2) || None || 4,637 || 24–25 || 6–18
|- bgcolor="#ddffdd"
| May 8 ||  || || Sewell–Thomas Stadium || 9–8 || Gardner (3–2) || Simpson (0–3) || None || 2,766 || 25–25 || –
|- bgcolor="#ffdddd"
| May 11 || at LSU|| ||Alex Box StadiumBaton Rouge, LA || 5–7 || Kodros (1–1) || Medders (0–4) || Peterson (3) || 10,685 || 25–26 || 6–19
|- bgcolor="#ddffdd"
| May 12 || at LSU || || Alex Box Stadium || 6–1 || Walters (3–5) || Hilliard (8–4) || None || 11,153 || 26–26 || 7–19
|- bgcolor="#ffdddd"
| May 13 || at LSU || || Alex Box Stadium || 3–7 || Bush (1–1) || Rukes (1–3) || None || 10,758 || 26–27 || 7–20
|- bgcolor="#ffdddd"
| May 17 || No. 10 Ole Miss ||  || Sewell–Thomas Stadium || 2–3 || Rollison (8–4) || Finnerty (4–4) || Caracci (10) || 3,305 || 26–28 || 7–21
|- bgcolor="#ddffdd"
| May 18 || No. 10 Ole Miss || || Sewell–Thomas Stadium || 3–0 || Walters (4–5) || Feigl (8–5) || None || 3,373 || 27–28 || 8–21
|- bgcolor="#ffdddd"
| May 19 || No. 10 Ole Miss || || Sewell–Thomas Stadium || 8–10 || Holston (2–0) || Cameron (1–3) || None || 3,991 || 27–29 || 8–22
|-

† Indicates the game does not count toward the 2018 Southeastern Conference standings.Rankings are based on the team's current  ranking in the Collegiate Baseball poll.

Record vs. conference opponents

Rankings

See also
 2018 Alabama Crimson Tide softball team

References

Alabama
Alabama Crimson Tide baseball seasons
Alabama Crimson Tide baseball